Ahmed Darwish may refer to:
 Ahmed Darwish (footballer, born 1984), Saudi football player
 Ahmed Darwish (footballer, born 2000), Emirati footballer
 Ahmed Darwish (politician) (born 1959), Egyptian politician
 Ahmed Darwish (sport shooter) (born 1981), Egyptian sport shooter